The Africa-South America Summit (ASA Summit) is a tri-annual bi-continental diplomatic conference between the leading politicians of countries in South America and Africa. It was first held in 2006 in Abuja, Nigeria, followed by iterations in 2009 on Isla Margarita, Venezuela and in 2013 in Malabo, Equatorial Guinea.

List of summits

First ASA Summit
The first summit was held in Abuja and spearheaded by Luiz Inácio Lula da Silva. It promulgated the Abuja Declaration and Plan of Action, as well as the resolution creating the "South America - Africa Cooperation Forum" (ASACOF).

Second ASA Summit

Third ASA Summit
The third ASA summit was scheduled to be held in Libya in 2011, but due to the civil war which broke out that year, was postponed to 2012 and again to 2013, when it was finally held in Malabo. Chavez was a notable exception, being represented by Venezuelan foreign minister Elias Jaua due to Chavez's cancer treatment.

Fourth ASA Summit
The fourth summit was scheduled to be held in Ecuador in 2016.

See also
 South Atlantic Peace and Cooperation Zone

References

External links
 African Union on the ASA
 ASA Summit on the Brazilian Foreign Ministry website

21st-century diplomatic conferences
African Union
Union of South American Nations
Recurring events established in 2006